Ida C. Craddock (August 1, 1857 – October 16, 1902) was a 19th-century American advocate of free speech and women's rights. She wrote extensively on sexuality, leading to her conviction and imprisonment for obscenity. Facing further legal proceedings after her release, she committed suicide.

Early life
Ida Craddock was born in Philadelphia; her father died before she was five months old.  Her mother home-schooled her as an only child and provided her with an extensive Quaker education.

In her twenties, after passing the entrance exams, Craddock was recommended by the faculty for admission into the University of Pennsylvania as its first female undergraduate student.  However, her entrance was blocked by the university's board of trustees in 1882.  She went on to publish a stenography textbook, Primary Phonography, and to teach the subject to women at Girard College.

In her thirties, Craddock left her Quaker upbringing. She developed an academic interest in the occult through her association with the Theosophical Society beginning around 1887.  Through her writing, she tried to synthesize translated mystic literature and traditions from many cultures into a scholarly, distilled whole. As a freethinker, she was elected Secretary of the Philadelphia chapter of the American Secular Union in 1889. Although a member of the Unitarian faith, Craddock became a student of religious eroticism, then proclaimed she was a Priestess and Pastor of the Church of Yoga. Never married in a traditional sense, Craddock claimed to have a blissful ongoing marital relationship with an angel named Soph.  Craddock stated her intercourse with Soph was so noisy, they drew complaints from her neighbors. Her mother responded by threatening to burn Craddock's papers, and unsuccessfully tried to have her institutionalized.

Craddock moved to Chicago, and opened a Dearborn Street office offering "mystical" sexual counseling to married couples via both walk-in counseling and mail order.  She dedicated her time to "preventing sexual evils and sufferings" by educating adults, achieving national notoriety with her editorials in defense of Little Egypt and her controversial belly dancing act at the World's Columbian Exposition held in Chicago during 1893.

Writings

Craddock wrote many serious instructional tracts on human sexuality and appropriate, respectful  sexual relations between husband and wife.  Among her works were Heavenly Bridegrooms, Psychic Wedlock, Spiritual Joys, Letter To A Prospective Bride, The Wedding Night and Right Marital Living.  Aleister Crowley reviewed Heavenly Bridegrooms in the pages of his journal The Equinox, stating that it was:

These sex manuals were all considered obscene by the standards of her day. Their distribution led to numerous confrontations with various authorities, often initiated by Craddock.  She was held for several months at a time on morality charges in five local jails as well as the Pennsylvania Hospital for the Insane.

Her first two full-length books, Lunar & Sex Worship and Sex Worship, were on comparative religion.

Her writings on supernatural topics also continued throughout her life.  One of her last books on this subject was Heaven of the Bible, published in 1897.

Indictments
Mass distribution of Right Marital Living through the U.S. Mail after its publication as a featured article in the medical journal The Chicago Clinic led to a federal indictment of Craddock in 1899. She pled guilty, and received a suspended sentence. In 1902, a subsequent trial in New York on charges of sending The Wedding Night through the mail during a sting operation ended with her conviction. Craddock refused to plead insanity in order to avoid being incarcerated, and was sentenced to three months in prison, serving most of her time in Blackwell's Island workhouse. Upon her release, Anthony Comstock immediately re-arrested her for violations of the Comstock Act. On October 10, Craddock was tried and convicted, with the judge declaring The Wedding Night to be so "obscene, lewd, lascivious, dirty" that the jurors would not be allowed to see it during the trial.

At 45 years old, Craddock saw her five-year prison sentence as a life term. On October 16, 1902, the day before she was due to be sent to a federal penitentiary, Craddock died by suicide after slashing her wrists and inhaling natural gas from the oven in her apartment. She penned a final private letter to her mother as well as a lengthy public suicide note condemning Comstock, who had become her personal nemesis. Comstock had opposed Craddock almost a decade before during the Little Egypt affair, and effectively acted as her prosecutor during both legal actions against her in federal court. He had sponsored the Comstock Act, which was named after himself, under which she was repeatedly charged.

After death
Theodore Schroeder, a free speech lawyer from New York with an amateur interest in psychology, became interested in Ida Craddock's case a decade after her death. During his research of her life, he collected her letters, diaries, manuscripts, and other printed materials. Although he never met Craddock, he speculated she had at least two human lovers, although Craddock insisted she only had intercourse with Soph, her spirit husband.

Sexual techniques from Craddock's Psychic Wedlock were later reproduced in Sex Magick by Louis T. Culling.

Today, Ida Craddock's manuscripts and notes are preserved in the Special Collections of the Southern Illinois University Carbondale.  Her battle with Anthony Comstock is the subject of the 2006 stage play Smut by Alice Jay and Joseph Adler, which had its world premiere at Miami's GableStage in June 2007.

In 2010, after a century of her works remaining almost completely out of print, Teitan Press published Lunar and Sex Worship by Ida Craddock, edited and with an introduction by Vere Chappell.  Also in 2010, Vere Chappell wrote and compiled "Sexual Outlaw, Erotic Mystic: The Essential Ida Craddock". He describes this as "an anthology of works by Ida Craddock, embedded in a biography." The book reprints "The Danse du Ventre (1893), Heavenly Bridegrooms (1894), Psychic Wedlock (1899), "The Wedding Night" (1900), "Letter from Prison" (1902), "Ida's Last Letter to Her Mother" (1902), "Ida's Last Letter to the Public" (1902). Another biography of Craddock, "Heaven's Bride" by Leigh Eric Schmidt was also published in 2010.

See also
 Vajroli mudra, a hatha yoga practice that inspired Craddock

References

Bibliography
 
 
   Reprints of her tracts and suicide notes.
 
 
 
 
 .

Further reading

Andrea Jain. (2015). "On the notion of a “creator” of modern yoga". Oxford University Press.

1857 births
1902 suicides
American relationships and sexuality writers
American spiritual writers
American Unitarians
American women's rights activists
American yoga teachers
People convicted of obscenity
Former Quakers
Free speech activists
Political activists from Pennsylvania
Writers from Philadelphia
American sex educators
Suicides by gas
Suicides by sharp instrument in the United States
Suicides in New York City
American people of Welsh descent
Free love advocates
American women non-fiction writers
19th-century American women writers
Educators from Pennsylvania
19th-century American women educators
19th-century American educators
1902 deaths